Lieutenant General Tariq Khan  is a retired Pakistan Army general officer who was the Commander of I Strike Corps at Mangla. A war hero, he has been the Inspector General of the Frontier Corps from September 2008 till October 2010.

He has also commanded the 1st Armoured Division in Multan from 2006 to 2007 and then the 14th Infantry Division in South Waziristan till 2008. Khan gained fame when he led the Frontier Corps to victory against Tehrik-e-Taliban Pakistan in the Battle of Bajaur in 2009.

Pakistan Army career 
Tariq Khan belongs to the Tank area of Pakistan. He was commissioned in the Armoured Corps in the 55th PMA Long Course on 16 April 1977 and was awarded the Sword of Honour from the Pakistan Military Academy. He has participated in the First Gulf War of 1991, and contributed towards the international effort in the War on Terrorism as Pakistan's Senior National Representative at CENTCOM, Tampa, Florida from 2004 to 2005.

Khan was then promoted to major general in 2006 and commanded an armoured division in Multan and later an infantry division in South Waziristan leading Operation Zalzala against the militants. After commanding an infantry division, Maj Gen Tariq was posted as IG FC KPK, where he changed FC from a ragtag group of fighters into a force on par with Pakistan Army. As IG FC, he commanded the spearhead of Pakistan's war against terror. On 1 October 2010 he was promoted to the rank of Lieutenant General and appointed Corps Commander Mangla and Commander Central Command.

Honors 
The officer has been successful in turning the Frontier Corps around from a force in great difficulty into a highly professional one which has seen great successes in its recent operations against the militants in Federally Administered Tribal Areas and Khyber Pakhtunkhwa, Pakistan. On 9 December 2007, Tariq Khan received United States Legion of Merit for meritorious services as a liaison officer at CENTCOM during Operation Enduring Freedom.

Awards and decorations

Foreign Decorations

References

External links
VIDEO: Interview of Maj. Gen. Tariq Khan (Urdu)
55th PMA Long Course
55 PMA Facebook page

Pakistani generals
Pashtun people
Living people
Foreign recipients of the Legion of Merit
People of the insurgency in Khyber Pakhtunkhwa
Pakistan Armoured Corps officers
Tank District
Year of birth missing (living people)
Army Burn Hall College alumni